The provincial flag of Saskatchewan was adopted in 1969. It is blazoned per fess vert and or, in the fly a prairie lily slipped and leaved proper, in the dexter chief an escutcheon of the coat of arms of Saskatchewan fimbriated argent. The symbolism within the flag is shown just with the colours; yellow representing the grain fields in the southern portion of the province where as the green represents the northern forested areas.  The western red lily in the fly of the flag is the provincial flower.
In 2017, The Minister of Parks, Culture and Sports designated September 22 as Saskatchewan Flag Day.

History 
The flag of Saskatchewan was adopted on September 22, 1969, the result of a province-wide competition that drew over 4000 entries. The winning entry was one of the 13 designed by Anthony Drake of Hodgeville, Saskatchewan. Drake came and left Saskatchewan from the United Kingdom and did not have an opportunity to see his winning design fly until returning to Hodgeville.  Saskatchewan politician Percy Schmeiser was on the flag committee in 1969 during his time as member of the Legislative Assembly and was at the inaugural flag raising ceremony, unlike Anthony Drake. The two finally met when Drake returned in 2019.

Other flags

60th anniversary flag 
In preparation for the province's Diamond Jubilee the government had opted to organize a competition to design a distinctive flag utilizing the colours of the province's coat of arms. Sister Imelda of St. Angela's Convent of Prelate had designed the winning flag and it was selected from 241 other entries. The flag was first hoisted on the 31st of January in the year 1965. Its use continued as the province's centennial flag for 1967 and in the years prior to the contest and selection of the current flag Sister Imelda's was used as well. The flag's sponsors had hoped it would officially be the province's flag as it was being used to represent Saskatchewan but that was not the case.

The Diamond Jubilee flag is blazoned per fess gules and vert, in the fly an escutcheon of the Arms of Saskatchewan fimbriated or, in the hoist a stalk of wheat or. The red featured in the top half symbolizes the fires that used to rage through the wheat fields in the years before cultivation, the green represents the luxuriant growth, and the gold representing the ripening the wheat fields.

Fransaskois flag 

This flag used to represent the heritage of the French speakers of Saskatchewan and is blazoned Or a cross enhanced throughout vert, its vertical beam to the hoist, in the fly a fleur-de-lis gules its traverse vert.

The symbolism within the Fransaskois flag is mostly the same as the provincial flag with the yellow and green representing the wheat and the forests respectively. However, with the addition of the cross alluding to the role that the Catholic Church and the many missionaries had in settling what is now the province of Saskatchewan and the fleur-de-lis which represents the Francophone population globally; it is coloured red to show the fighting courage in the battle of preserving the rights of their culture and language; it makes the flag distinguishable enough to stand out on its own.

Standard of the Lieutenant Governor of Saskatchewan 

The Lieutenant Governor of Saskatchewan is a viceregal representative of the monarch of Canada and thus has their own flag. It has precedence over any other flag except the Royal Standard and the flag of the Governor General of Canada, unless the Governor General is a guest of the Lieutenant Governor. This flag is flown at the home and office of the Lieutenant Governor as well as any buildings that may conduct official duties.

It is blazoned Azure the shield of Arms of the Province of Saskatchewan ensigned with the Royal Crown proper and encircled by a wreath of maple leaves Or.

Gallery

See also 

 List of Canadian provincial and territorial symbols
 Symbols of Saskatchewan

References

External links 
 Flag of Saskatchewan in the online Public Register of Arms, Flags and Badges
 Saskatchewan – Flags of the World

Flag
Flags of Saskatchewan
Flags of Canada
Flags introduced in 1969
Saskatchewan